Drinsey Nook is a small village in the West Lindsey district of Lincolnshire, England. The village sits on the bank of the east of Lincoln section of the Foss Dyke, a canal which runs from the River Trent to the River Witham. The population of the village is included in the civil parish of Kettlethorpe. The main building is the former Drinsey Nook Inn which is actually situated in Nottinghamshire; this was previously known as the 'Buffalo Inn' on old Ordnance Survey maps.

Drinsey Nook is notable for Tom Otter, a man who murdered his new wife in 1805. Otter, reputedly from Treswell, was already a married when he married his wife, Mary, whom he murdered the same day near the bridge that now bears his name. He was hanged in 1806, and was held in a Gibbet post adjacent to Gibbet Wood. Tom Otter lane is the B1190 running south from the village, and  Tom Otters Bridge is named after the site of the murder.

References

External links

The Tale Of Tom Otter

Villages in Lincolnshire
West Lindsey District
Murder in England